Andrea Federici (born 24 February 1997) is an Italian sprinter.

Achievements

See also
 Italian national track relay team

References

External links
 

1997 births
Living people
Italian male sprinters
20th-century Italian people
21st-century Italian people
Mediterranean Games medalists in athletics
Athletes (track and field) at the 2022 Mediterranean Games
Mediterranean Games gold medalists for Italy